The 2016–17 season was Real Madrid Club de Fútbol's 113th season in existence and the club's 86th consecutive season in the top flight of Spanish football. It covered a period from 1 July 2016 to 30 June 2017.

The 2016–17 season was one of the most successful campaigns in the history of Real Madrid. The club attained four titles, including a La Liga and Champions League double, a feat only achieved twice before by Real (in 1956–57 and 1957–58).

This season was the first since 2003–04 and 2008–09 without Álvaro Arbeloa who departed to join West Ham United, having stayed at the club for seven years during his second spell.

Season overview

Pre-season
On 15 June 2016, Denis Cheryshev was sold to Villarreal. On 21 June 2016, Álvaro Morata re-joined the club under a buy back clause from Juventus for a €30M fee.

August
On 8 August 2016, Jesé moved to Paris Saint-Germain. On 9 August 2016, Real won the UEFA Super Cup, producing a 3–2 comeback victory against Sevilla after extra time. On 21 August 2016, Madrid started off the league campaign with a 3–0 victory at Real Sociedad with a brace from Gareth Bale and a goal from Marco Asensio. On 27 August 2016, at their home debut of the season, goals from Morata and Toni Kroos gave Madrid a narrow 2–1 victory against Celta Vigo.

September
On 10 September 2016, Real Madrid started the new month with a 5–2 victory over Osasuna with goals by Cristiano Ronaldo, Danilo, Ramos, Luka Modrić and Pepe. On 14 September 2016, late goals from Ronaldo and Morata got Madrid off to a winning start in the Champions League season against Sporting CP. On 18 September 2016, Real Madrid won 2–0 at Espanyol by goals from James Rodríguez and Karim Benzema. With that win, Real won their 16th straight La Liga game, equalling the record. On 21 September 2016, Madrid drew Villarreal 1–1 at home with a goal from Ramos. On 24 September 2016, Madrid came home with their second straight draw after a 2–2 stalemate at Las Palmas, with goals from Asensio and Benzema. On 27 September 2016, Madrid drew Borussia Dortmund 2–2 in the Champions League, with goals from Ronaldo and Raphaël Varane.

October
On 2 October 2016, Madrid faced SD Eibar at the Bernabéu, with the match ending in a 1–1 draw. Bale scored for Real, as the team extended their winless streak to four games. On 15 October 2016, Madrid finally snapped that streak, crushing Real Betis 6–1 on the road, thanks to a brace from Isco and goals from Raphaël Varane, Benzema, Marcelo and Ronaldo. On 18 October 2016, Real won 5–1 in the Champions League against Legia Warsaw by goals from Bale, Asensio, Lucas Vázquez, Morata and an own goal. On 23 October 2016, Morata gave Madrid a late 2–1 win against Athletic Bilbao after Benzema scored the opening goal. On 26 October 2016, the cup competition got underway with a 7–1 win over Cultural Leonesa, thanks to braces from Asensio and Morata and goals from Nacho and Mariano. On 29 October 2016, a hat-trick from Ronaldo and a goal from Morata gave Madrid a 4–1 win at Alavés.

November
On 2 November 2016, Mateo Kovačić gave Madrid the late equalizer in a 3–3 draw at Warsaw, after Bale and Benzema opened a 2–0 lead. On 6 November 2016, a brace from Bale and a goal from Morata helped Madrid to a 3–0 win against Leganés. On 19 November 2016, Real defeated Atlético Madrid 3–0 in the Madrid derby at the Vicente Calderón, thanks to a Ronaldo hat-trick. On 22 November 2016, goals from Varane and Benzema secured Madrid a 2–1 victory at Sporting CP and the qualification to the knockout stage of the Champions League. On 26 November 2016, a brace from Ronaldo gave Madrid a 2–1 home win over Sporting de Gijón. On 30 November 2016, Madrid defeated Cultural Leonesa 6–1 in the second leg of the round of 32 in the Copa del Rey, with a hat-trick from Mariano and goals from Rodríguez, Enzo Fernández and an own goal. Real won 13–2 on aggregate and advanced to the next round.

December
On 3 December 2016, Madrid drew to Barcelona in the first Clásico of the season, with a late goal from Ramos. On 7 December 2016, a brace from Benzema was not enough in a 2–2 draw against Borussia Dortmund, which resulted in Madrid finishing second in their Champions League group. On 10 December 2016, Madrid needed another late goal from Ramos to win 3–2 against Deportivo La Coruña, after Morata and Mariano scored the other goals. This game set a new record as it was the 35th game for Los Blancos without a loss. On 15 December 2016, Madrid defeated América 2–0 in the semi-final of the Club World Cup with goals from Benzema and Ronaldo. On 18 December 2016, a hat-trick from Ronaldo and a goal from Benzema secured Madrid the Club World Cup title with a 4–2 extra time victory over Kashima Antlers in the final.

January
On 4 January 2017, the new year started with a 3–0 victory over Sevilla in the first leg of the round of 16 in the Copa del Rey, with a brace from Rodríguez and a goal from Varane. On 7 January 2017, a brace from Isco and goals from Benzema, Ronaldo and Casemiro secured Madrid a 5–0 win against Granada, equaling the Spanish record for an unbeaten run with 39 games, shared with Barcelona. On 12 January 2017, a last minute goal from Benzema secured a 3–3 draw against Sevilla, getting the unbeaten run to 40 games, a new record in Spanish football. The other goals were from Asensio and Ramos. Madrid advanced to the quarter-finals of the Copa del Rey after winning 6–3 on aggregate. On 15 January 2017, in their third meeting against Sevilla in 11 days, Madrid lost 1–2 despite an opening goal from Ronaldo. With that loss, the unbeaten streak ended at 40 matches. On 18 January 2017, Madrid lost their second straight game with a 1–2 defeat at the hands of Celta Vigo in the first leg of the Copa del Rey quarter-finals, despite an equalizer by Marcelo. On 21 January 2017, a Ramos brace in the first half gave Madrid a 2–1 win against Málaga. On 25 January 2017, Madrid were eliminated from the Copa del Rey after a 2–2 draw against Celta Vigo in the second leg of the quarter-finals (4–3 loss on aggregate). Ronaldo and Lucas Vázquez scored the goals, with the former netting a spectacular free kick. On 29 January 2017, goals from Kovačić, Ronaldo and Morata secured Madrid a 3–0 win over Real Sociedad.

February
On 11 February 2017, the new month was started with a 3–1 away win at Osasuna. Ronaldo, Isco and Vázquez scored the goals. On 15 February 2017, in the first leg of the round of 16 in the Champions League against Napoli, Madrid won 3–1 at home, thanks to goals from Benzema, Kroos and Casemiro. On 18 February 2017, Morata and Bale secured Madrid a 2–0 victory over Espanyol. On 22 February 2017, in a midweek game against Valencia, Real lost 2–1 despite a goal from Ronaldo. On 26 February 2017, being down 0–2, Bale, Ronaldo and Morata scored the goals to complete a comeback, winning 3–2 at Villarreal.

March
On 1 March 2017, an early Isco goal gave Madrid the lead before they went down 1–3, and Ronaldo scored a late brace to secure a draw for ten-man Madrid against Las Palmas. On 4 March 2017, after a brace from Benzema and goals from Rodríguez and Asensio, Madrid defeated Eibar 4–1. On 7 March 2017, Madrid defeated Napoli 3–1 in the second leg of the Champions League round of 16 with goals from Ramos, Morata and an own goal. Madrid won 6–2 on aggregate. On 12 March 2017, a goal from Ronaldo and Ramos' winning header gave Madrid a 2–1 win over Real Betis. On 18 March 2017, goals from Benzema and Casemiro gave Madrid a 2–1 away win at Athletic Bilbao.

April
On 2 April 2017, goals from Benzema, Isco and Nacho gave Madrid a winning start into the new month, with a 3–0 victory over Alavés. On 5 April 2017, a hat-trick from Morata and a goal from Rodríguez gave Madrid a 4–2 away win over Leganés. On 8 April 2017, a goal from Pepe was not enough in a 1–1 draw against Atlético Madrid. On 12 April 2017, a Ronaldo brace helped Madrid to secure a 2–1 away win over Bayern Munich in the first leg of the Champions League quarter-finals. On 15 April 2017, Isco scored a brace with a late winner to complete a 3–2 comeback win for Madrid against Gijón, after Morata scored the other goal. On 18 April 2017, Madrid went through to the Champions League semi-finals after defeating Bayern 4–2 after an extra time comeback (6–3 on aggregate) at the Bernabéu thanks to a Ronaldo hat-trick and a goal from Asensio. On 23 April 2017, despite goals from Casemiro and Rodríguez, Madrid came up short with a late 2–3 defeat to Barcelona in the second Clásico of the season. On 26 April 2017, Madrid came back with a 6–2 away victory over Deportivo La Coruña, thanks to a brace from Rodríguez and goals from Morata, Vázquez, Isco and Casemiro. On 29 April 2017, a late goal from Marcelo gave Madrid a 2–1 win over Valencia after Ronaldo put Real in the lead.

May
On 2 May 2017, Ronaldo scored yet another hat-trick and Madrid ran away with a thumping 3–0 victory against Atlético Madrid in the first leg of the Champions League semi-finals. On 6 May 2017, a brace apiece from Morata and Rodríguez against Granada guided Madrid to a 4–0 victory. On 10 May 2017, an Isco goal was enough for Madrid to reach the Champions League final, despite Atlético winning the second leg 2–1, meaning that Real advanced by an aggregate score of 4–2. On 14 May 2017, a Ronaldo brace and goals from Nacho and Kroos secured Real a 4–1 win over Sevilla. On 17 May 2017, two goals from Ronaldo and one from each Benzema and Kroos got Madrid a 4–1 away victory in the rescheduled match at Celta Vigo. That win gave Madrid the lead in the league table, with one game left. On 21 May 2017, a 2–0 win over Málaga, with goals from Ronaldo and Benzema, secured the 33rd league title for the club.

June
On 3 June 2017, Real Madrid won the 2016–17 UEFA Champions League, defeating Juventus 4–1 in the final, with a brace from Ronaldo and goals from Casemiro and Asensio. Real won their second consecutive, third in four years and twelfth overall title. With that victory, Madrid also became the first team to defend their title in the Champions League era.

Players

Transfers

In

Total spending:  €30M

Out

Total income:  €34.5M
Net income:  €4.5M

Pre-season and friendlies

Competitions
Times from 9 August to 29 October 2016 and from 26 March to 21 May 2017 are UTC+2, from 30 October 2016 to 25 March 2017 UTC+1, unless otherwise noted.

Overview

La Liga

League table

Results summary

Results by round

Matches

Copa del Rey
Madrid joined the competition in the round of 32.

Round of 32

Round of 16

Quarter-finals

UEFA Champions League
Madrid joined the competition in the group stage.

Group stage

Knockout phase

Round of 16

Quarter-finals

Semi-finals

Final

UEFA Super Cup
Madrid secured their spot by winning the 2015–16 UEFA Champions League.

FIFA Club World Cup
Madrid secured their spot by winning the 2015–16 UEFA Champions League.

Statistics

Squad statistics

|}

Goals

1 Includes 2016 UEFA Super Cup and 2016 FIFA Club World Cup.

Clean sheets

1 Includes 2016 UEFA Super Cup and 2016 FIFA Club World Cup.

Disciplinary record

1 Includes 2016 UEFA Super Cup and 2016 FIFA Club World Cup.

References

External links

Real Madrid CF seasons
Real Madrid
Real Madrid
Real Madrid
Spanish football championship-winning seasons
UEFA Champions League-winning seasons
FIFA Club World Cup-winning seasons